Muhammad Havlidar Aslam (born 10 October 1921) was a Pakistani long-distance runner. He competed in the marathon at the 1952 Summer Olympics and the 1956 Summer Olympics.

References

1921 births
Possibly living people
Athletes (track and field) at the 1952 Summer Olympics
Athletes (track and field) at the 1956 Summer Olympics
Pakistani male long-distance runners
Pakistani male marathon runners
Olympic athletes of Pakistan
Place of birth missing (living people)
20th-century Pakistani people